Khaqan Arsal (born 10 December 1984) is a Pakistani first-class cricketer who played for Lahore cricket team.

References

External links
 

1984 births
Living people
Pakistani cricketers
Lahore cricketers
Cricketers from Lahore